Stary Folwark  is a village in the administrative district of Gmina Suwałki, within Suwałki County, Podlaskie Voivodeship, in north-eastern Poland.

During the German occupation of Poland (World War II), in 1939, Polish parish priest from Bakałarzewo  was briefly imprisoned in the village by the Germans before he was moved to the prison in Suwałki and eventually murdered in the forest near the village of Krzywe, as part of the Intelligenzaktion.

References

Stary Folwark